The Chief of the Army Staff (COAS), informally known as Chief Sa'ab, is the commander and highest-ranking officer of the Nepalese Armed Forces.

The Chief of Army Staff is the Chief of the Nepalese Army and reports to the Ministry of Defense. The appointment is constitutionally subjected to be for three years or up to 61 years of age whichever is earlier. The seat of Chief of Army Staff is in Bhadrakali, Kathmandu. The current Chief of Army Staff is General Prabhu Ram Sharma, since 9 September 2021. The Chief of Army Staff also holds the honorary rank of General of the Indian Army.

History
The Kajis of Gorkha Kingdom (later Kingdom of Nepal) carried the functions of army chief. In the 19th century, Mukhtiyar Bhimsen Thapa was the first person to use Commander-in-Chief as the title of army chief. During the Rana dynasty, the post of army chief was hereditary. In 1979, General Singha Pratap Shah was raised with the title of Chief of Army Staff (COAS) instead of Commander-in-Chief (C-in-C). Since then, COAS is the title of army chief of Nepalese Army. Since 1950, it has been tradition for the President of India to award the chief of the Nepalese Army with the honorary rank of General of the Indian Army.

Appointment
As per Section 8 of Army Act (2063) of Nepal, the Chief of Army Staff is appointed by the President of Nepal on the recommendation of Council of Ministers of Nepal. The Chief of Army Staff is the head of the Nepalese military. As per Section 10 of the same, the appointment is subjected to be for three years or up to 61 years whichever is earlier. As per Section 8(3) of Nepal Army Act (2063), in case of leave by current COAS, the President of Nepal can appoint the seniormost officer as the acting Chief of Army Staff. When General Rajendra Chhetri left for 15 days tour on 30 June 2017 to United States, Chief of General Staff Lt. Gen. Baldev Raj Mahat was appointed Acting Chief of the Army Staff as per section 8(3). Similarly, then CGS Lt. Gen. Purna Chandra Thapa was appointed as the acting Chief of Army Staff on 8 August 2018 at the traditional last month leave of General Chhetri.

Powers, duties and responsibilities
As per Section 9(1) of Army Act (2063) of Nepal, the Chief of Army Staff shall manage the armed forces under the instructions of the Government of Nepal and according to prevailing laws and acts. As per Section 9(2), the COAS shall submit an annual report on the management of Nepalese armed forces to the Government of Nepal on the Baisakh month of Hindu calendar.

Removal
As per Section 11 (1 & 2) of the Army Act, COAS is normally retired on completion of 3 years or up to age of 61 years of the person, whichever is earlier. However, as per the section 11(3) of the same, the COAS can be removed by the President of Nepal if deemed necessary by Government of Nepal on the recommendation of Council of Ministers of Nepal.

List of Chiefs of the Army Staff of Nepal (1979–present)

Chief of General Staff

Chief of General Staff (CGS) is the deputy position of the Chief of Army Staff. The CGS is generally ranked as Lieutenant General (three star General). The chief of general staff is assigned to look after intelligence and operations in the Army. Now, the Vice Chief of Army Staff is the deputy position of the Chief of Army Staff.

Vice Chief and Assistant Chief

The Vice and Assistant Chief of Army Staff are the deputy positions of the Chief of Army Staff.

References

Books

Nepal
Nepal
Nepalese generals
Military ranks of the Nepali Army
1979 establishments in Nepal